Lingaraj Azad, popularly known as Azad Bhai, is a dalit activist from the Indian state of Orissa.  He became notable for his activism in opposing Vedanta Resources's bauxite refinery in Lanjigarh and mining of Niyamgiri Hills that tribals  say would displace thirty villages of Dongria Kondhs (the "Mountain Tribals") on top of the mountains.

Early life
Lingaraj Azad was born into a Dalit family in Orissa, a state in eastern India. Dalits are a diverse group of Scheduled Caste community in Orissa. Among dalits, his family more specifically belongs to the Ganda caste.

Activism
Western Orissa is rich in natural resources and many government and private companies have appropriated land to build number of natural resources extracting factories. Due to lack of official documentation of the Tribals and repressed class people's community rights over the forests, mountains, rivers and land they have been unable to claim their rights on community properties.
Anil Agarwal set up one of the world's largest aluminum smelting plants in the area, with a bauxite refinery at Lanjigarh at the foothills of the Niyamgiri Mountains. Azad and his organization Niyamgiri Suraksha Samiti (Association for the Safeguard of Niyamgiri Hills) - says apart from causing massive displacement, the project will destroy the forests in the area. It will also affect the water sources and ecosystems, thereby threatening the environment and the very source of sustenance for indigenous peoples, it says . Anil Aggarwal's Vedanta on its part says that it does not want to grab local peoples land and is willing to negotiate with all stake holders. Azad counters that the subsistence tribal communities would receive will not survive the alienation from their native land and they cannot be compensated for such a loss.

He has been jailed multiple times for his active involvement in the environmental movement.

He participated in the yatra (Sanskrit for journey, used in the context of Indian politics to mean an "awareness campaign") conducted by the NAPM from Mumbai to Delhi against proposed mega-industrial corridor in 2013.

See also
Kondha Tribals of Niyamgiri

References

http://articles.economictimes.indiatimes.com/2012-11-01/news/34857888_1_niyamgiri-hills-niyamgiri-project-bauxite
http://www.foilvedanta.org/uncategorized/global-day-of-action-against-vedanta-draws-thousands-in-london-odisha-and-goa/attachment/picture-56/
http://mylondondiary.co.uk/2012/08/aug28-03.htm
https://archive.today/20130218074932/http://www.cdca.it/spip.php?article1694&lang=it
http://www.cpimlnd.org/component/option,com_frontpage/Itemid,1/limit,5/limitstart,10/

External links
Lingaraj Azad: Real Avatar in real fight Niyamgiri
http://www.tehelka.com/story_main52.asp?filename=Fw170412SACRED.asp

People from Kalahandi district
Activists from Odisha
Adivasi activists
Living people
1962 births